Barun Biswas (12 September 1972 – 5 July 2012) was a Bengali school teacher and a social activist in Sutia, West Bengal, India. In 2000, he co-founded "Sutia Gonodhorshon Pratibad Mancha", an organisation which protested against a local criminal gang, who were using gang-rape to terrorise the people of Sutia. Biswas was murdered on 5 July 2012. In 2013, a Bengali film Proloy was made, based on his life and fight.

Life and career 
Biswas was born on 12 September 1972 in Sutia, North 24 Parganas district, West Bengal. His parents, Gita Biswas and Jagadish Biswas, migrated from Faridpur, Bangladesh after the 1971 Bangladesh Liberation War to Acharipara, Panchpota, in North 24 Parganas. His father worked as a labourer during the day and sang for a local theatre group at night to pay for his children's education.

Barun Biswas attended Panchpota Bharadanga High School.  He completed his schooling at Gobardanga Khantura High School. He received his B.A. in Bengali from Gobardanga Hindu College, his master's degree from Calcutta University, and his BEd from B.T. College, New Barrackpore.

After his education, Biswas passed the West Bengal School Service exam, and chose a career in social work and education. In 1998, he started his career as a school teacher at Mitra Institution (Main) of Kolkata, where he worked till his death. He was also an active member of Panchpota Sashadanga Sarada Seba Sangha.

Activism

Ichhamati river and water 
In 2000, Biswas started a campaign for the construction of a canal to check flooding of the Ichamati and Jamuna rivers.  The rivers were causing widespread flooding in Sutia, Bongaon, Swarupnagar, and Gaighata.  Biswas drew up a blueprint for the canal.  Though initially his plan met with little enthusiasm from local leaders, the government later built the canal.  Later, he was involved in the fight against gangs who were illegally blocking and diverting the Ichamati river for their businesses, causing floods in the village area.

2000—2012: Anti-rape activism 
Sutia and neighbouring villages were engulfed by a criminal gang during the late 1990s and early 2000s. From 2000—2002, 33 rapes (official figure, actual figure may have been much more) and  around a dozen murders were committed in Sutia. Biswas formed a group of villagers to fight crime and to demand arrests. In 2000, at age 28, he co-founded "Sutia Gonodhorshon Pratibad Mancha". The organisation started to hold public meetings to protest the rapes. During such a meeting, Biswas said:

Biswas' group helped rape victims give reports to the police that led to arrests of the gang members, including the leader of the gangs, Sushanta Choudhury. Biswas also counselled the raped women.

Death 

At 7:20 pm on 5 July 2012, when returning from Kolkata, Biswas was shot from behind in a parking lot outside the Gobardanga railway station. Subsequently, police from Habra, Gaighata, and Gopal Nagar arrested five men with ties to the Sutia gang.  This included the alleged hired killer, Sumanta Debnath, alias Fotke, Debashish Sarkar, Bishwajit Biswas, and Raju Sarkar, most of whom were local students. The alleged assassin reportedly confessed to the police that he was contracted by gang leader Sushanta Choudhury, who was serving life imprisonment in Dum Dum Central Jail.

Legacy 
In 2011 a teleserial named Proloy Asche was launched by Sananda TV loosely based on the life of Barun Biswas. In August 2013, a Bengali film called Proloy was made on the life of Biswas. Actor Parambrata Chatterjee portrayed the role of Barun Biswas.

In the 2013 Durga Puja, Panchpota Avijan Sangha Durga Puja Committee used Biswas' life and struggle as their puja'''s festive theme. They also named their puja platform Barun Mancha (Barun platform). Manobendra Biswas, joint secretary of the puja'' committee told— 
Barun's mamabari (maternal house) was in Sutia Panchpota and he had spent his childhood here. When Sutia was virtually ruled by rapists and criminals, he started a movement to help villagers fight the reign of terror through Sutia Pratibadi Mancha... Durga Puja marks the victory of Durga over Mahishasura and Barun's fight epitomizes the victory of good over evil.

Barun Biswas murder case stopped due to negligence

References 

2012 deaths
Activists from West Bengal
1972 births
People from North 24 Parganas district
Assassinated Indian people
Assassinated activists
Deaths by firearm in India
Indian schoolteachers
University of Calcutta alumni
People murdered in West Bengal
Educators from West Bengal
Indian women's rights activists